Dane Nielsen (born 10 June 1985) is an Australian former professional rugby league footballer. He previously played in the NRL for the Cronulla-Sutherland Sharks, Melbourne Storm, with whom he won the 2012 NRL Premiership, the New Zealand Warriors, St. George Illawarra, South Sydney and also the Bradford Bulls in the Championship.

Early years
From the North Queensland town of Mackay, Nielsen is of Indigenous Australian and Solomon Island descent.

He was a Norths Devils junior.

Playing career
Nielsen started his NRL career with the Cronulla-Sutherland Sharks, making his début on 20 July 2007 against the Manly-Warringah Sea Eagles.

Melbourne Storm
In 2008 Nielsen joined the Melbourne Storm, becoming a regular at centre. In 2009 Nielsen was sent-off for a high tackle in the Storm's round 15 clash with the Wests Tigers. Nielsen then went on to play in Melbourne's 2010 World Club Challenge victory against English champions, the Leeds Rhinos.

Nielsen was named as injured Greg Inglis' replacement at centre in the Queensland side for Game I and II of the 2011 State of Origin series.

In May 2012, he signed a three-year deal with the New Zealand Warriors starting in 2013. Later that year he played in the third and deciding game of the 2012 State of Origin series which Queensland won. At the end of the season Nielsen played for the Melbourne Storm in their 2012 NRL Grand final victory over the Canterbury-Bankstown Bulldogs.

New Zealand Warriors

Nielsen moved to Auckland for the 2013 New Zealand Warriors season, also the first for the club's new Australian coach Matthew Elliott.

St George Illawarra Dragons
On 19 November 2014, Nielsen signed a two-year deal with the St George Illawarra Dragons, starting from the 2015 season.

On 5 May 2015, Nielsen had his contract with the Dragons terminated due to disciplinary reasons.  It was alleged that a woman had made a complaint to the St George hierarchy claiming that an intoxicated Nielsen bit her on the leg on a night out on 22 March 2015. The club launched an inquiry into the complaint, and on 5 May 2015 announced their decision to terminate the players contract.

Bradford Bulls
After several games in the Mackay & District Rugby League, Nielsen signed a year and a half contract with the Bradford Bulls on 28 July 2015.

Nielsen featured in Qualifier 3 (Salford Red Devils) to Qualifier 6 (Leigh Centurions). Nielsen played in the £1 Million Game against Wakefield Trinity Wildcats.

South Sydney Rabbitohs
On 25 January 2016, Nielsen returned to Australia, signing a two-year contract with South Sydney. He also played in the NSW Cup for the Rabbitohs feeder club, the North Sydney Bears. Nielsen made his debut for the club in round 8, playing in the centres in the 30-8 win against the Brisbane Broncos.

In January 2017, he was sent home from South Sydney training after turning up “looking worse for wear”, after an alleged drunken night out. He played most of the first half of the season for the North Sydney Bears with the likes of Alex Johnston, Bryson Goodwin, Aaron Gray, Hymel Hunt, Robert Jennings, Siosifa Talakai, Cody Walker and even backrower Tyrell Fuimaono obtaining positions in the centres and on the wings.

Later career
On 21 July 2017, English side Featherstone Rovers offered Nielsen a contract which he agreed to in principle but the deal fell through due to visa issues. On 23 July 2017, Nielsen signed on to play with the Mackay Magpies, returning to club that he played with in 2015.

On 28 March 2018, it was revealed that Nielsen had been sacked by Group 9 side Junee Diesels without playing a single game for the club.  Nielsen was reportedly terminated after an alleged wild night out in Junee.  Junee club president Simon Vanzanten spoke to the media saying “We don’t take it very lightly at all and if it was something that was minor everyone gets one chance, but we’ve drawn a line in the sand, “After a few things that happened with the club over the past couple of years we have come on board to make sure we have a club for my kids and for the future.  We can’t put up with that sort of stuff".

References

External links
South Sydney Rabbitohs profile
NRL profile

1985 births
Living people
Australian rugby league players
Indigenous Australian rugby league players
Australian people of Solomon Islands descent
Queensland Rugby League State of Origin players
Indigenous All Stars players
Cronulla-Sutherland Sharks players
Melbourne Storm players
New Zealand Warriors players
St. George Illawarra Dragons players
Norths Devils players
Rugby league centres
Rugby league wingers
Rugby league players from Mackay, Queensland
North Sydney Bears NSW Cup players
South Sydney Rabbitohs players